Sir (Eric) Brian Smith (born 10 October 1933) is an English physical chemist who was Master of St Catherine's College, Oxford, and vice-chancellor of Cardiff University, Wales.

Life and career 
Smith was Master of St Catherine's College, one of the colleges of the University of Oxford (1988–94). In 1993, he was appointed vice-chancellor of Cardiff University, a post he held until his retirement in 2001.

From October 1998, Smith held an administrative role at the Welsh Development Agency, where he assisted in opening up Chinese and Indian commercial markets for Wales.
He was awarded a knighthood in 1999 in recognition of his efforts in building university links with industry and commerce. Smith is international ambassador for Cardiff University and serves on the Higher Education Funding Council for Wales.

References 

1933 births
Living people
Alumni of the University of Liverpool
Knights Bachelor
Masters of St Catherine's College, Oxford
People associated with Cardiff University
People educated at Wirral Grammar School for Boys
English physical chemists